Whiteout (including variants white out or white-out) may refer to:

Arts, entertainment, and media

Fictional characters 

 Whiteout (G.I. Joe), a fictional character in the G.I. Joe universe
 Whiteout (Marvel Comics), a comic book supervillain

Films 

 Whiteout (2009 film), based on the comic book
 Whiteout (2000 film), a Japanese film directed by Setsurou Wakamatsu

Music

Albums 

 White Out (album), a 2000 album by American band Verbow
 Whiteout (album), a 2000 album by rock band Boss Hog
 Whiteout (EP), a 2012 song and eponymous EP by Dawn Richard

Songs 

 "White Out", a 2014 song by Amy Lee featuring Dave Eggar from the album Aftermath
 "Whiteout", a song by Killing Joke on the 1994 album Pandemonium

Groups 

 White Out (band), an American experimental rock group
 Whiteout (band), a Scottish rock group

Literature 

 Whiteout (Judge Dredd novel), a 2005 novel by James Swallow
 Whiteout (Follett novel), a 2004 novel by Ken Follett
 Whiteout (Oni Press), a 1998 comic book limited series by Greg Rucka
 Whiteout: The CIA, Drugs and the Press, a history book by Alexander Cockburn and Jeffrey St. Clair

Sports 

 White Out (Penn State), a college football tradition at Penn State during its home games against Michigan and Ohio State, where all spectators come dressed in white
 Winnipeg White Out, a hockey tradition started by fans of the Winnipeg Jets

Other uses 

 Whiteout (weather)
 Whitey (drugs) or white-out; paleness as a result of drug-related nausea
 White Out, a flavor of Mountain Dew soda
 Wite-Out, a brand of correction fluid